María del Carmen Calleja de Pablo (1949, Seville - December 31, 2012, Seville) was a Spanish politician, belonging to the Spanish Socialist Workers' Party. She served as a member of the Congress of Deputies of Spain, elected from Jaén, 1996–2000. She also served as civil governor of Jaén province.

References

2012 deaths
Spanish Socialist Workers' Party politicians
1949 births
People from Seville